Dame Anne Elizabeth Jane Evans,  (born 20 August 1941) is an international British operatic soprano.

Early life
Evans was born in London of Welsh descent. She studied at the Royal College of Music with among others Margaret Cable, and the Geneva Conservatoire. She was accepted into the conservatoire without actually having had any formal training as a singer. For her audition she surprisingly did Carmen. She started out as a mezzo at the Royal College, but one of her teachers immediately recognised her soprano potential.

Career
Evans made her debut as Countess Ceprano in Rigoletto 1967 in Geneva and went on to make her debut in a leading role in 1968 as Fiordiligi in Così fan tutte at the then Sadler's Wells, later English National Opera in 1968 to critical acclaim.

In the early years of her career, she sang many of the leading Puccini and Mozart soprano roles, like Tosca and Countess Almaviva in Le Nozze di Figaro. In the late sixties she started to work with the lighter Wagner roles, like Elsa in Lohengrin and Senta in The Flying Dutchman, roles that became her trade mark. However, it was the role of Brünnhilde that would earn her international fame, most notably in the Wagner temple of Bayreuth in 1989-1992, a performance which was also captured on CD and video (now transferred to DVD, and announced on Blu-ray by the end of 2012), conducted by Daniel Barenboim and directed by Harry Kupfer. In this performance she sang with example Siegfried Jerusalem and John Tomlinson. She also earned an Olivier Award for this production. She also played Isolde in Tristan und Isolde, a role often considered to be her finest achievement.

Retirement
In 2003, she retired from performing to dedicate herself to giving masterclasses and to coach other British singers in Wagnerian performance techniques. Her last public performance was in 2005 in a comeback performance in Cardiff doing excerpts from her celebrated Isolde and other Wagner performances.

Honours
Evans was appointed Dame Commander of the Order of the British Empire (DBE) in the 2000 Queen's Birthday Honours "for services to music".

References

 BBC Wales, Biography (Cardiff Singer of the World 2005 Jury]
 Skramstad,  Per-Erik, Interview with Anne Evans, wagneropera.net

External links
 

1941 births
Living people
Dames Commander of the Order of the British Empire
Laurence Olivier Award winners
English operatic sopranos
British people of Welsh descent
Alumni of the Royal College of Music
Singers from London
Singers awarded knighthoods
20th-century British women opera singers
21st-century British women opera singers